Douglas Adams (1952–2001) was an English writer and dramatist.

Douglas or Doug Adams may also refer to:

Douglas Adams (cricketer) (1876–1931), American cricketer
Douglas Adams (engineer), American engineer
Douglas Q. Adams, Indo-Europeanist professor of English
Doug Adams (American football) (1949–1997), American football player
Doug Adams (baseball) (born 1943), MLB player
Doug Adams (music journalist), American music journalist and author
Doug Adams (television producer), American television producer
Douglas Adams, CEO of Adams Cable

See also
Doug Adam (1923–2001), Canadian ice hockey player